The canton of Valognes is an administrative division of the Manche department, northwestern France. Its borders were modified at the French canton reorganisation which came into effect in March 2015. Its seat is in Valognes.

It consists of the following communes:

Azeville
Brix
Écausseville
Émondeville
Éroudeville
Flottemanville
Fontenay-sur-Mer
Fresville
Le Ham
Hémevez
Huberville
Joganville
Lestre
Lieusaint
Montaigu-la-Brisette
Montebourg
Ozeville
Quinéville
Saint-Cyr
Saint-Floxel
Saint-Germain-de-Tournebut
Saint-Joseph
Saint-Marcouf
Saint-Martin-d'Audouville
Saussemesnil
Sortosville
Tamerville
Urville
Valognes
Vaudreville
Yvetot-Bocage

References

Cantons of Manche